The Luxembourg men's national under-16 basketball team is a national basketball team of Luxembourg, administered  by the Luxembourg Basketball Federation. It represents the country in men's international under-16 basketball competitions.

Luxembourg has been successful at the U16 European Championship Division C level, winning two gold and two silver medals.

FIBA U16 European Championship participations

See also
Luxembourg men's national basketball team
Luxembourg men's national under-18 basketball team
Luxembourg women's national under-16 basketball team

References

External links
Official website 
Archived records of Luxembourg team participations

Basketball teams in Luxembourg
Basketball
Men's national under-16 basketball teams